IV: Empires Collapse is the fourth studio album by American thrash metal band Warbringer, released on October 29, 2013 via Century Media.

Track listing
All songs written by Warbringer

Personnel
Warbringer
John Kevill – lead vocals
John Laux – guitars
Jeff Potts – guitars
Ben Mottsman –  bass
Carlos Cruz – drums

Production
 Steve Evetts - producer
 Adam Hessler - engineering
 Brett Eliason - mixing
 Adrienne Rozzi - artwork

References 

2013 albums
Warbringer albums
Century Media Records albums
Albums produced by Steve Evetts